Santa Claus (born Thomas Patrick O'Connor, May 1947) is an American politician, monk, and child welfare activist. Claus gained recognition as a member of the North Pole, Alaska City Council, and as a candidate for the 2022 Alaska's at-large congressional district special election. He changed his name to match the legendary character in 2005, to help bring awareness to his advocacy for children's health and welfare, a time during which he engaged in a nation-wide tour to champion that cause. Claus has expanded his advocacy as a congressional candidate into the broader sphere of democratic socialism, including support for Medicare for All, coronavirus relief, a wealth tax, and student loan cancellation.

Early life and education 
Claus was born in Washington, D.C. He earned a bachelor's degree and master's degree from New York University. He also completed a doctoral course in educational communication and technology, although he never completed his dissertation that would grant him his doctorate.

Career 
During his studies at NYU, Claus worked as a bouncer at several New York bars and clubs, including McSorley’s Old Ale House. In 1971, he began serving as special assistant to the deputy police commissioner in New York City. He was a founding director of the Terrorism Research and Communications Center, an academic collective researching the formation and foundations of terrorist groups. That position led him to be appointed to FEMA's National Defense Executive Reserve. Claus's team favoured an active approach to investigating sources of terrorism, involving seeking out the underlying problems, however, he reports that this approach was dismissed by national security officials.

Jaded with federal government, Claus secured a job as chief of safety and security at the United States Virgin Islands territory port, overseeing two international airports and four marine ports. Before moving to Alaska, Claus also worked at a radio station in Telluride, Colorado, and as vice president of a Lake Tahoe television station. His tenure in public service broadcasting continued as he moved north, serving for a stint on the Alaska Public Broadcasting Commission. Before becoming a councillor, Claus also worked as a senior ranger for the Fairbanks North Star Borough’s Chena Lake Recreation Area.

Claus is a Christian monk of the Anglican order Anam Cara, and has worked as an emergency response chaplain.

Early advocacy 
Claus attributes his interest in child welfare and his democratic socialist values to the "plethora of ills that plague America’s youth" he observed during his time in public service. He has spent much of his life campaigning to bring greater protections to underprivileged and marginalized children, especially in the U.S., where he has volunteered with around 30 different non-profit organizations.

After growing out his beard in monk tradition, he realized he could achieve greater recognition by leaning into the Santa Claus image that many people perceived. He changed his name in 2005 and moved to North Pole, Alaska, in 2013. Claus has stated that he believes legislators engage with him and his ideas more readily as a result, partially as a result of the positive media attention it garners. Indeed, during his 2022 congressional run, political analysts noted that, optically, campaigning against 'Santa' would be challenging. In spite of this, competing candidate Josh Revak willingly characterised his own campaign as "waging a war on Santa", calling Claus' policies "Marxist fantasies".

In 2009, Claus won the International Peace Prize presented by the Santa Claus Peace Council for his child welfare advocacy.

To further maximize the effect of his advocacy, Claus ran for president in 2012. He received 625 votes in Maryland.

North Pole City Council 
After moving to Alaska in 2013, he became the president of the North Pole Chamber of Commerce. During that time he successfully lobbied Alaska to pass Erin's Law, which trains teachers to recognize signs of child abuse. Claus was elected to the North Pole City Council in 2015 as a write-in candidate, winning with 58 votes. In 2016, Claus spoke out against a proposed ban of marijuana dispensaries in North Pole, successfully swaying his council colleagues to reject the proposition. Claus was re-elected to the council in 2019, with 100 votes. He is currently the mayor pro tem.

2022 Alaska congressional special election 
Claus ran in the 2022 Alaska's at-large congressional district special election. He intended to only complete the remainder of Congressman Don Young's term, and made clear that he was not interested in running for the additional full term, to be contested in November 2022. Claus was among 48 candidates running in the non-partisan June primary, including former Alaskan Governor Sarah Palin, used ranked-choice voting for the first time. The top four candidates will contest the Special General Election on August 16. A poll of 605 voters from Alaska Survey Research in May 2022 placed Claus with approximately 6% of the vote, which would have seen him place fourth, proceeding to the general election. Claus finished in sixth place in the election and subsequently endorsed Democrat Mary Peltola for the general election.

Political positions 
Claus supported Joe Biden in the 2020 United States presidential election after Bernie Sanders dropped out of the Democratic primary.

Claus is a proponent of medical marijuana. He describes himself as having a strong affinity with Bernie Sanders, sharing many of the Vermont senator's positions on racial justice, corporate accountability, and election freedoms. Claus does not accept corporate donations, nor does he accept personal donations. He supports the expansion of Medicare and the reduction of federal defense spending, describing himself as "fiscally conservative but socially liberal". Claus is in favor of an expanded child tax credit, a wealth tax, and the PRO Act. He has questioned the power and influence of social media companies like Twitter and Facebook. Moreover, he supports reproductive rights, including the funding of Planned Parenthood, and improving the accessibility of abortions.

Claus has disavowed Alaska's "extractive oil economy", pointing to the effects of climate change and environmental pollution, especially on the Arctic National Wildlife Refuge. He has also vowed to improve Alaska's broadband infrastructure, which is currently underserved in many rural parts of the state.

Personal life 
Claus has a stepson, but is not currently married. He has confirmed that he has had multiple cancers, but has not shared any specific diagnoses. As a monk, Claus has taken a religious vow of poverty, making just $300 a month as a North Pole councilman. He reportedly volunteers over 1,000 hours per year.

References 

1947 births
Living people
People from North Pole, Alaska
Santa Claus
Alaska city council members
Child welfare activism
American democratic socialists
Date of birth missing (living people)
21st-century American politicians
New York University alumni
Alaska Independents
Candidates in the 2022 United States House of Representatives elections